Emad Soliman (born 23 July 1959) is an Egyptian former footballer. He competed in the men's tournament at the 1984 Summer Olympics.

References

External links
 
 

1959 births
Living people
Egyptian footballers
Egypt international footballers
Olympic footballers of Egypt
Footballers at the 1984 Summer Olympics
1988 African Cup of Nations players
Egyptian Premier League players
Place of birth missing (living people)
Association football forwards
Mediterranean Games bronze medalists for Egypt
Mediterranean Games medalists in football
Competitors at the 1983 Mediterranean Games
Egyptian football managers
Abha Club managers
Saudi First Division League managers
Expatriate football managers in Saudi Arabia
Egyptian expatriate sportspeople in Saudi Arabia
Ismaily SC players
El Qanah FC players
Ismaily SC managers
Tala'ea El Gaish SC managers